José Jácques y Medina (born 26 September 1944) is a Mexican politician from the Party of the Democratic Revolution. From 2006 to 2009 he served as Deputy of the LX Legislature of the Mexican Congress representing the Federal District.

References

1944 births
Living people
Politicians from Mexico City
Party of the Democratic Revolution politicians
21st-century Mexican politicians
Deputies of the LX Legislature of Mexico
Members of the Chamber of Deputies (Mexico) for Mexico City